Grand Canyon West is a census-designated place (CDP) in Mohave County, Arizona, United States, located on the Hualapai Reservation. The population was reported as 0 at the 2020 census. Grand Canyon West is home to the tribe's Grand Canyon business operations, including the Grand Canyon West Airport and the Grand Canyon Skywalk. Typically, they are open from 8:00 a.m. – 6:00 p.m., including all holidays.

Geography
Grand Canyon West is located in northern Mohave County at  (35.999787, -113.810249). The CDP is served by Diamond Bar Road, which leads southwest  to County Highway 25 near Meadview.

Demographics

As of the 2010 census, there were 2 people living in the CDP, both male. 0 were 19 years old or younger, 0 were ages 20–34, 0 were between the ages of 35 and 49, 1 was between 50 and 64, and the remaining 1 was aged 65 and above. The median age was 70.5 years.

The racial makeup of the CDP was 100% White, with 0.0% of the population being Hispanic or Latino of any race.

There were 2 households in the CDP, both non-family households (100%), with an average household size of 1.00. Both non-family households adult males living alone.

The CDP contained 19 housing units, of which 2 were occupied and 17 were vacant.

Education
Almost all of Grand Canyon West is in the Hackberry School District, while a portion is in the Kingman Unified School District.

References

External links
Grand Canyon West website

Census-designated places in Mohave County, Arizona